This was the second of two editions of the tournament in the 2021 tennis season. Benjamin Bonzi was the defending champion but lost in the second round to Jenson Brooksby.

Brooksby won the title after defeating Teymuraz Gabashvili 2–6, 6–3, 6–0 in the final.

Seeds

Draw

Finals

Top half

Bottom half

References

External links
Main draw
Qualifying draw

Potchefstroom Open II - 1